Rodrigo Roach (born 12 October 1972) is a Chilean sprinter. He competed in the men's 4 × 100 metres relay at the 2000 Summer Olympics. His twin brother, Ricardo, competed in the same event.

References

1972 births
Living people
Athletes (track and field) at the 2000 Summer Olympics
Chilean male sprinters
Olympic athletes of Chile
Place of birth missing (living people)
Twin sportspeople
20th-century Chilean people